Huez is a commune in the Isère department in southeastern France. The mountain resort Alpe d'Huez is located in the commune. L'Alpe d'Huez is often an ascent on the Tour de France.

Population

Twin towns
Huez is twinned with:

  Bormio, Italy, since 2005

See also
Alpe d'Huez
Communes of the Isère department

References

External links

Official site

Communes of Isère